James Eugene Urbanek (April 8, 1945 – August 24, 2009) was an American football defensive tackle. He played college football at the University of Mississippi, where he received first-team All-American status in 1966 and 1967.

Urbanek was selected in the third round of the 1968 draft of the American Football League (AFL) by the Miami Dolphins and played in 1968.

Urbanek was inducted into the University of Mississippi Athletics Hall of Fame in 2002.

See also
List of American Football League players

References

External links
Stats

1945 births
2009 deaths
Sportspeople from Oxford, Mississippi
Players of American football from Mississippi
American football defensive tackles
Ole Miss Rebels football players
Miami Dolphins players
American Football League players